Deanne Bennett Criswell is an American emergency management officer who has served as the administrator of the Federal Emergency Management Agency since April 2021. Criswell is the first woman to lead FEMA. She was previously the commissioner of the New York City Emergency Management Office.

Education 
Criswell attended elementary school in Free Soil, Michigan and was graduated in 1984 from Catholic Central High School in Manistee, Michigan. She then earned a Bachelor of Science in technology education from Colorado State University, a Master of Public Administration from the University of Colorado Denver, and a Master of Arts in homeland security from the Naval Postgraduate School.

Career 
Criswell served as a member of the Colorado Air National Guard with the 140th Wing and was deployed to Kuwait. She also worked as a firefighter for 21 years. Criswell managed the Office of Emergency Management for the city of Aurora, Colorado. She later worked in the Federal Emergency Management Agency during the Barack Obama administration before becoming the commissioner of the New York City Emergency Management department in 2019.

Her nomination to be the next FEMA administrator was submitted to the United States Senate on February 22, 2021. She was confirmed on April 22, 2021, by voice vote, and was sworn in by Department of Homeland Security Secretary Alejandro Mayorkas on April 26, 2021.

Criswell reintroduced the FEMA flag on April 12, 2022 for public display.

References

External links

|-

Living people
Biden administration personnel
Colorado State University alumni
Commissioners in New York City
Federal Emergency Management Agency officials
Naval Postgraduate School alumni
New York City Emergency Management
People from Aurora, Colorado
University of Colorado Denver alumni
Year of birth missing (living people)